The Riverside Drive Historic District is a historic district located at the west bank of the confluence of the Licking River and the Ohio River in Covington, Kentucky, directly across from Cincinnati, Ohio.

Prior to the city of Covington's founding, George Rogers Clark used the area as a mustering spot for incursions against the Indians from Ohio who were raiding Kentucky, and then later for organizing troops for his Illinois campaign. It is believed that the first white settlers of the Greater Cincinnati area chose the Riverside Drive area for their settlement.  Riverside Drive was a popular place to build the finest houses in Covington, with many still standing from the early 19th century. Over thirty of the buildings in the district are considered exceptional samples of their architectural style.

There are several independently notable buildings in the district. The Daniel Carter Beard Boyhood Home was the boyhood home of Daniel Carter Beard, founder of the Boy Scouts of America, and is a National Historic Landmark. The 1815-built Thomas Carneal House, the first brick house in Covington, is a Georgian-style domicile reminiscent of Italian architect Andrea Palladio; it still features a tunnel leading to the Licking River that allowed the owners to help slaves escape from their rightful owners as part of the Underground Railroad. Prominent visitors to the house included the Marquis de Lafayette, Henry Clay, Andrew Jackson, and Daniel Webster.

Seven bronze statues of prominent figures in the history of the area are placed in lifelike poses on riverside benches.  These include James Bradley, Daniel Carter Beard, John James Audubon, and Chief Little Turtle.

Gallery

See also
 Licking Riverside Historic District

References

National Register of Historic Places in Kenton County, Kentucky
Geography of Kenton County, Kentucky
Historic districts on the National Register of Historic Places in Kentucky